The R296 road is a regional road in County Sligo, Ireland that runs from Ballymote to Quarryfield where it merges into R294 road from Gorteen to Tobercurry.

It is the most direct route from Ballymote to Tobercurry.

See also
Roads in Ireland
National primary road
National secondary road

References
Roads Act 1993 (Classification of Regional Roads) Order 2006 – Department of Transport

Regional roads in the Republic of Ireland
Roads in County Sligo